Alfonso Maiorana is a Canadian documentary filmmaker and cinematographer. He is most noted for his film Rumble: The Indians Who Rocked the World, for which he won the Canadian Screen Award for Best Cinematography in a Documentary at the 6th Canadian Screen Awards in 2018.

References

External links

Canadian cinematographers
Canadian documentary film directors
Film directors from Quebec
Living people
Year of birth missing (living people)
Best Cinematography in a Documentary Canadian Screen Award winners